This is a list of WBC Muaythai international challenge winners, showing every "international challenge" match winner certificated by the World Boxing Council Muaythai (WBC Muaythai). The WBC, which is one of the four major governing bodies in professional boxing, started certifying their own Muay Thai world champions in 19 different weight classes in 2005.

The international challenge matches are for the competitors who are not qualified for the official championships, therefore it is not championship. In addition, it is completely different from "international championships".  The winners of international challenge matches are given commemorative belts.

Super heavyweight

Heavyweight

Super cruiserweight

Cruiserweight

Light heavyweight

Super middleweight

Middleweight

Super welterweight

Welterweight

Super lightweight

Light weight

Super featherweight

Featherweight

Super bantamweight

Bantamweight

Super flyweight

Flyweight

Light flyweight

Mini flyweight

See also
List of WBC Muaythai diamond champions
List of WBC Muaythai world champions
List of WBC Muaythai international champions

References

Lists of Muay Thai champions
WBC